Tonya Ingram (September 1, 1991 – December 30, 2022) was an American poet, author, speaker, disability activist, and mental health advocate.

Ingram died on December 30, 2022, waiting for a kidney transplant.

Life

Education 
Ingram was a graduate of New York University and Otis College of Art and Design.

Performance and poetry 

Ingram's writing was often about Black feminism and living with Lupus and kidney failure. 

Ingram performed at the Nuyorican Poets Café, The John F. Kennedy Center for the Performing Arts, and Lexus Verses and Flow's variety show. 

Her work was featured in the 2021 Madewell "What Are You Made Of? Creatives of Color" campaign, Hallmark's Mahogany Writing Community and card brand, MIGA Swimwear, The New York Times, To Write Love on Her Arms, and Hello Giggles. 

Ingram was the curator of Poetry in Color Live! at Los Angeles County Museum of Art.

Journalism and activism 
In addition to poetry, Ingram wrote and contributed to high-profile journalistic pieces on wasted organ donations, the dysfunction of the American healthcare system, the impact of COVID-19 on disabled people, and other disability rights issues. In 2021, she testified as a patient on the kidney transplant waitlist on a House of Representatives hearing regarding the organ transplant system.

Surfing 
In 2020, Ingram learned to surf through Color the Water and AdventureCrew, BIPOC surfing communities, and attended a surf retreat in Nicaragua.

Search for a kidney

Efforts and advocacy 
In 2019, at age 27, Ingram posted on Instagram looking for a living person willing to become her kidney-donor. The organ procurement system (OPS) in the United States, run by the United Network for Organ Sharing (UNOS), as of 2019, failed to recover around 28,000 organs a year. Utilizing journalism, Ingram and writer and organ-recipient, Kendall Ciesemier, asked the government to hold the organizations involved in OPS accountable, believing this would result in Ingram receiving a kidney. Ingram wrote an opinion essay; appeared in a government video; wrote letters to members of the Biden administration, including the Centers for Medicare and Medicaid Services (C.M.S.) administrator Chiquita Brooks-LaSure and the head of the Health Resources and Services Administration, Carole Johnson; worked with members of Congress, including Representative Katie Porter; and even testified before the House Oversight Subcommittee on Economic and Consumer Policy in May 2021.

Aftermath 
Ingram told the House Oversight Subcommittee on Economic and Consumer Policy that she would die without the federal government's urgent action. A year and a half later, on Dec. 30, 2022, Ingram died of complications from kidney failure.

In 2022, Ingram was one of 12,000 people on waiting lists who died or became too sick to receive a transplant.

Ingram's friend and fellow journalist, Kendall Ciesemier, commented on future potential for intervention in the organ procurement system by the American government:

Death 
Ingram was found unresponsive during a wellness check at her apartment around noon on December 30, 2022. Her death was announced in an Instagram post on New Year's Day.

An article from the Los Angeles Times states, "Ingram was on the kidney donor wait list for three years. In an interview, [Matthew "Cuban"] Hernandez said he believed her death was preventable."

Hernandez and his wife Alyesha Wise were close friends of Ingram's and raised $30,000 for funeral arrangements and to build a trust to send Ingram's 15-year-old younger sister to college.

With the money, they honored Ingram's wish to have a green burial underneath a tree. The ceremony to bury her occurred on the grounds of Hollywood Forever Cemetery under a California Oak on January 27, 2023.

In an episode of the podcast, "So Life Wants You Dead", Ingram stated, "I do not invite death, but I am not afraid of it. Meaning when it is time, I am at peace with it, I don't fear it… I just have such a deep peace knowing that this body will rest."

Works

Books 
 How to Survive Today, Wild Awake Publishing, 2020
 Another Black Girl Miracle, Not a Cult, 2018
 Growl and Snare, Penmanship Books, 2013

Performed Poems 
 "On Praying to God While Taking the SAT Exam", Brave New Voices, 2011
 "Thirteen", Intermedia Arts, 2013
 "Unsolicited Advice (after Jeanann Verlee)", CUPSI New York City, 2013
 "Isms", NPS Boston, 2013
 "Khaleesi", NPS Boston, 2013
 "I Am Twenty-Two", NPS Oakland, 2014
 "Raise Up", The Kennedy Center, 2014
 "Monster", NPS Oakland, 2015
 "We Are Full", NPS Oakland, 2015
 "Live", NPS Oakland, 2015
 "Suicide", Da Poetry Lounge Slam, 2015
 "An Open Letter to My Depression", Buzzfeed, 2015
 "Seven Commandments", Sofar NYC, 2016
 "I Am 24", Brooklyn Slam, 2016
 "Dear Discouraged", To Write Love On Her Arms, 2016
 "Until the Stars Collapse", Art Share, 2018
 "Here is What Loneliness / Love Tells You", Los Angeles Theatre Center, 2018
 "For the Next Lover", Los Angeles Theatre Center, 2018
 "On Days You Miss Your Ex", Los Angeles Theatre Center, 2018

Awards & Titles 
 Slam Champion, New York Knicks Poetry, 2011
 Recipient of $10,000, New York Knicks Leader of Tomorrow Scholarship, 2011
 Team Member at Urban Word, Second Place Team at Brave New Voices, 2011
 Team Co-founder, SLAM! NYU, 2012
 Slam Champion, SLAM! NYU Grand Slam, 2013
 Team Member at Nuyorican, Grand Slam Team, 2013
 Nominee, Pushcart Prize, 2014
 Team Member at Da Poetry Lounge, Slam Team, 2015

Interviews 
 "Lupus: Poet Tonya Ingram on Navigating the Organ Donor System", So Life Wants You Dead Podcast
 "Dating, Self-Care, and Chronic Illness", Just Break Up Podcast
 "Another Black Girl Miracle", We Have Jobs We Swear Podcast
 "The Journey and Intersections of Mental Health and Faith", Yas and Amen Podcast
 "007", Keep Creating Podcast
 "Tonya Ingram", Sexually Satisfied Woman Series

References 

1991 births
2022 deaths
21st-century American journalists
21st-century American poets
African-American poets
African-American women journalists
American disability rights activists
American medical journalists
American online journalists
American public speakers
American women poets
African-American feminists
African-American women writers
American feminist writers
Feminist theorists
LGBT African Americans
Living people
21st-century African-American writers